Theobald V may refer to:
 Theobald V, Count of Blois (1130–1191)
 Theobald V of Champagne (c. 1239 – 1270)